The 2021 Green Party of Aotearoa New Zealand male co-leadership election was held to determine the future leadership of the Green Party of Aotearoa New Zealand. The election was won on the first ballot by incumbent co-leader and List MP, James Shaw.

Background
In July 2021 Green Party member James Cockle announced his intention to stand for co-leader of the Green Party at that years annual general meeting (AGM). This triggered an election to fill the male co-leadership. It was the first time a sitting co-leader had been challenged for the leadership at an AGM since 2013.

Candidates

James Cockle 
Cockle, a climate activist and software developer from Dunedin, ran for the leadership campaigning largely on promoting existing Green Party policy. He stated his unhappiness with the progress the Greens were making during the Parliamentary term and wanted the Greens to become a "major party" and cease being seen as "Labour's little helper".

James Shaw 
James Shaw had been a List MP since 2014 and had been co-leader since 2015. Following the formation of the Sixth Labour Government, which the Green Party supported, he was appointed a minister outside cabinet as Minister for Climate Change (2017–present) and Minister of Statistics (2017–2020). Shaw stated he was "quietly confident" he would be re-elected by party members.

Result
The voting was conducted via ballot of the 140 party delegates from electorates across the country. The following table gives the ballot results:

References

2021 elections in New Zealand
Green Party of Aotearoa New Zealand leadership elections
Indirect elections
Green Party of Aotearoa New Zealand male co-leadership election